Aulakh is a Jat clan in the Punjab region of India and Pakistan. They are mainly concentrated in the tehsil of Ajnala in the Amritsar district of Punjab, India, with significant presence in the Shahbazpur of Tarn Taran district in the Majha region.

Notable people with the surname Aulakh include:
 Arj Barker, American comedian and actor
 Ajmer Singh, Indian sprinter 
 Ajmer Singh Aulakh, Indian author
 Angad Aulakh, American filmmaker
 Arjan Singh, Indian Air Force Marshal
 Baldev Singh Aulakh, Indian politician
 Gurmit Singh Aulakh, American Khalistani activist
 Jawahar Singh, Wazir of the Sikh Empire
 Jeet Aulakh, Canadian artist
 Jind Kaur, Maharani of the Sikh Empire
 Malik Ahmad Ali Aulakh, Pakistani politician
 Manny Aulakh, Canadian cricketer 
 Mohammad Irfan, Pakistani cricketer
 Ratan Aulakh, Indian filmmaker
 R. D. Singh, Indian athletics coach

See also 
Aulakh (village)

References

Jat clans
Jat clans of India
Jat clans of Pakistan
Punjabi tribes